The 2009 Trans-Am Series was the 41st running of the Sports Car Club of America's Trans-Am Series. It was also the first official season since 2005. (Although the series held two races at Heartland Park Topeka in 2006, the races were considered after the fact to be exhibition events and no championship is officially counted.). Tomy Drissi won the series championship over the seven rounds contested.

Results

Final points standings

References

Trans-Am Series
2009 in American motorsport